Pt. Ram Prasad Bismil Autonomous State Medical College, Shahjahanpur is a tertiary referral Government Medical college. It was established in year 2019 at Shahjahanpur.

About college
The college imparts the degree Bachelor of Medicine and Surgery (MBBS).The selection to the college is done on the basis of merit through National Eligibility and Entrance Test. Yearly undergraduate student intake is 100 from the year 2019. This college is also known as Pt. Ram Prasad Bismil Autonomous State Medical College Shahjahanpur.

Courses
Autonomous State Medical College, Shahjahanpur undertakes education and training of students MBBS courses with annual intake of 100 students 
The College has also started DNB courses and the prospect of Post-graduation courses in future is increasing.

See also
List of hospitals in India

References

External links 

Medical colleges in Uttar Pradesh
Shahjahanpur district
Educational institutions established in 2019
2019 establishments in Uttar Pradesh